Gerth Stølting Brodal is a professor at the University of Aarhus, Denmark.

Contributions 
Brodal queues - a heap/priority queue structure.

References 

Living people
Danish computer scientists
Academic staff of Aarhus University
Year of birth missing (living people)
Place of birth missing (living people)
Aarhus University alumni